Artiñano is a surname of Basque origins. Notable people with the surname include:

Javier Artiñano (1942–2013), Spanish costume designer
Rocío Abreu Artiñano (born 1974), Mexican politician

References

Basque-language surnames